UFC 182: Jones vs. Cormier was a mixed martial arts event held on January 3, 2015, at the MGM Grand Garden Arena in Las Vegas, Nevada.

Background
The event was headlined by a Light Heavyweight Championship bout between the champion at that time, Jon Jones, and top contender Daniel Cormier.

Jones was initially scheduled to face Alexander Gustafsson in a rematch on September 27, 2014 at UFC 178.  However, Gustafsson pulled out of the bout due to a knee injury and was replaced by Daniel Cormier. Subsequently, on August 12, Jones pulled out of the bout against Cormier citing a leg injury, which in turn led to the rescheduling of the pairing to this event.

A matchup for the Women's Bantamweight Championship between the champion at the time Ronda Rousey and top contender Cat Zingano was briefly attached to this event. However, it was announced in late October that the pairing was delayed and would take place eight weeks later at UFC 184.

Danny Castillo was expected to face Rustam Khabilov, but visa issues forced Khabilov out of the fight. He was replaced by Paul Felder, who was originally scheduled to fight at UFC Fight Night: McGregor vs. Siver.

Alexis Dufresne missed weight on her first attempt at the weigh ins, weighing in at 138 pounds. She was given additional time to make the bantamweight limit, but made no attempt to cut further. Instead, she was fined 20 percent of her purse, which went to Marion Reneau.

UFC 182 became the second longest UFC event behind UFC 136 with a total in-cage fight time of 154 minutes and 56 seconds.

On January 6, it was announced that Jones failed a drug test prior to the event. He tested positive for benzoylecgonine, the primary metabolite of cocaine. As benzoylecgonine is not banned out of competition by the World Anti-Doping Agency, the NSAC could not halt Jones from fighting at UFC 182. He was randomly tested on December 4 and the results came back on December 23, the NSAC Executive Director Bob Bennett said. Jones immediately entered rehab, though it was later revealed by his mother that he only spent one night in rehab.

On February 10, it was announced that Héctor Lombard failed a fight night drug test, testing positive for the anabolic steroid desoxymethyltestosterone. The failed drug test was responsible for the cancellation of his bout against Rory MacDonald at UFC 186. On March 23, Lombard was suspended for one year, fined and had his win over Josh Burkman overturned to a no contest by the NSAC. He was fined his original $53,000 win bonus, plus one-third of the rest of his purse, which included $53,000 in show money. In addition, Lombard also must pass a drug test prior to getting relicensed by the NSAC.

Results

Bonus awards
The following fighters were awarded $50,000 bonuses:

Fight of the Night: Jon Jones vs. Daniel Cormier
Performance of the Night: Paul Felder and Shawn Jordan

Reported payout
The following is the reported payout to the fighters as reported to the Nevada State Athletic Commission. It does not include sponsor money and also does not include the UFC's traditional "fight night" bonuses.
 Jon Jones: $500,000 (no win bonus) def. Daniel Cormier: $90,000
 Donald Cerrone: $140,000 (includes $70,000 win bonus) def. Myles Jury: $16,000
 Brad Tavares: $50,000 (includes $25,000 win bonus) def. Nate Marquardt: $49,000
 Kyoji Horiguchi: $40,000 (includes $20,000 win bonus) def. Louis Gaudinot: $10,000
 Hector Lombard: $106,000 (includes $53,000 win bonus) def. Josh Burkman: $45,000
 Paul Felder: $20,000 (includes $10,000 win bonus) def. Danny Castillo: $36,000
 Cody Garbrandt: $16,000 (includes $8,000 win bonus) def. Marcus Brimage: $12,000
 Shawn Jordan: $44,000 (includes $22,000 win bonus) def. Jared Cannonier: $8,000
 Evan Dunham: $54,000 (includes $27,000 win bonus) def. Rodrigo Damm: $12,000
 Omari Akhmedov: $20,000 (includes $10,000 win bonus) def. Mats Nilsson: $8,000
 Marion Reneau: $17,600 (includes $8,000 win bonus) def. Alexis Dufresne: $6,400 ^

^ Alexis Dufresne was fined 20 percent of her purse for failing to make the required weight for her fight with Marion Reneau. That money was issued to Reneau, an NSAC official confirmed.

See also
List of UFC events
2015 in UFC

References

Ultimate Fighting Championship events
2015 in mixed martial arts
Mixed martial arts in Las Vegas
MGM Grand Garden Arena
January 2015 sports events in the United States